The educational system generally refers to the structure of all institutions and the opportunities for obtaining education within a country. It includes all pre-school institutions, starting from family education, and/or early childhood education, through kindergarten, primary, secondary, and tertiary schools, then lyceums, colleges, and faculties also known as Higher education (University education). This framework also includes institutions of continuous (further) professional and personal education, as well as private educational institutions.

While the education system is usually regulated and organized according to the relevant laws, a country's education system may have unregulated aspects or dimensions. Typically, an education system is designed to provide education for all sections of a country's society and its members. It comprises everything that goes into educating the population.

The United Nations Educational, Scientific and Cultural Organization (UNESCO) recognizes nine levels of education in its International Standard Classification of Education (ISCED) system (from Level 0 (pre-primary education) through Level 8 (doctoral)). UNESCO's International Bureau of Education maintains a database of country-specific education systems and their stages.

See also 
 System
 Education
 Educational stage
 International Standard Classification of Education

Bibliography 
 Kallen, Denis (1996) Evaluating and reforming education systems. Paris, Organisation for Economic Co-operation and Development 
 Helmut Fend: Die sozialen und individuellen Funktionen von Bildungssystemen: Enkulturation, Qualifikation, Allokation und Integration. In: Hellekamps, S./Plöger, W./Wittenbruch, W. (Hrsg.): Handbuch der Erziehungswissenschaft. Bd. 3: Schule. Paderborn u. a. 2011, S. 41–53.
 Průcha, Jan. (1999) Vzdělávání a školství ve světě. 1. vyd. Praha: Portál, 320 s. ISBN 80-7178-290-4. S. 16
 Peeter Mehisto, Fred Genesee (2015) Building Bilingual Education Systems, Cambridge University Press,
 Michael Belok, Krishna Gopal (1979) Educational Systems: Occidental and Oriental. Anu Prakashan
 García Garrido, José Luis. (ed.) Diagnosis of the Educational System. Madrid, Instituto Nacional de Calidad y Evaluación (España) 2000
 Sam Kaplan (2006) The Pedagogical State: Education and the Politics of National Culture in Post-1980 Turkiye, Stanford University Press
 Clyde Chitty (1999) The education system transformed. Tisbury : Baseline Book 
 EURYDICE:European Unit (1988) The Greek education system, Brussels, Published for the Commission of the European Communities, Directorate-General [for] Employment, Social Affairs and Education 
 Musa Kraja (1998, 2006) Pedagogjia. Tiranë,

References 

Education systems
Systems